Gergini is a village in Gabrovo Municipality, in Gabrovo Province, in northern central Bulgaria.

Gergini Reef in Antarctica is named after the village.

References

Villages in Gabrovo Province